Kalmon Dolgin (born 1943) is a New York real estate investor and developer. He is the president of Kalmon Dolgin Affiliates, Inc and a member of the Dolgin family recognized by Real Estate Weekly as one of the most prominent real estate families in New York.

Biography
Dolgin was born to a Jewish family, the son of Israel and Diana Dolgin, and raised in Great Neck, New York. He was one of four children: Neil Dolgin (born 1953); Dr. Stuart Dolgin (deceased 2001); and filmmaker Gail Dolgin (1945-2010). His grandfather, also named Kalmon Dolgin, was an immigrant from Russia who operated a grocery store and then in 1904, founded his own real estate brokerage business in Brooklyn named Kalmon Dolgin Affiliates, Inc. In 1943, Dolgin's father and his uncle, Morris Dolgin, expanded the business into property ownership by purchasing a building in Williamsburg, Brooklyn; they eventually built a portfolio of mostly industrial buildings in Brooklyn and Queens.

Dolgin graduated with a B.A. from Syracuse University and with a J.D. from Syracuse University College of Law. He is also a Member of the Bar of the State of New York and a Licensed Real Estate Broker in New York and New Jersey. In the 1960s, the younger Kalmon joined the firm and in the 1970s, his brother Neil joined the firm. The Dolgin brothers expanded the company's operations from its roots in Brooklyn and Queens into the Bronx, Staten Island, Long Island, Manhattan, New Jersey, Connecticut, and Westchester County, New York. In 2004, they acquired for $127 million, a portfolio of seventeen medical office buildings throughout the East Coast of the U.S. In 2005, they purchased a 50% interest in the Long Island City, Queens industrial landmark Falchi Building for $61 million. In 2006, they expanded into Philadelphia, purchasing the Philadelphia Design & Distribution Center for $31 million and in 2007, they acquired the Spring Mill Corporate Center in the Philadelphia suburb of Conshohocken, Pennsylvania for $61 million. Dolgin currently serves as president of both Kalmon Dolgin Affiliates, Inc. and KND Management Co., Inc., and is Of Counsel at the law firm of Agins, Siegel & Reiner. As of 2013, the company has three divisions: a management company, a brokerage, and a development company and is known for the conversion of industrial buildings into commercial and residential use.

Personal life
Dolgin is married to Margaret "Peggy" Dolgin with whom he has three children: Joshua Dolgin, the fourth generation in the family business; Brynn Dolgin; and Daniel Dolgin. Dolgin is a supporter of the Lustgarten Foundation for Pancreatic Cancer Research, the illness that killed his brother. His nephew, Grant Dolgin, is also in the family business.

References

People from Great Neck, New York
American people of Russian-Jewish descent
American real estate businesspeople
1943 births
Syracuse University College of Law alumni
Syracuse University alumni
Living people